KJUL (104.7 FM) is a radio station broadcasting a soft adult contemporary format. Licensed to Moapa Valley, Nevada, United States, the station serves most of the Las Vegas area though its transmitter is over 50 miles northeast of Las Vegas.  The station is owned by Summit American, Inc.

History
The station was assigned the call letters KBHQ on July 17, 1998.  On July 20, 2005, the station changed its call sign to KWLY then again on November 4, 2005, to the current KJUL.

The station was originally licensed in 2001 in Moapa Valley under the call sign KBHQ; it signed on July 1.  In 2005, KBHQ was upgraded to a full class-C1 facility by increase of tower height and 100 kW ERP, with a signal serving the NorthEast Las Vegas market metro area.  KBHQ became classic country "Willie" KWLY on July 20, 2005, and then on November 7 adopted the adult-standards format abandoned by Beasley Broadcasting's KCYE, which switched to country music.

Past & present personalities
Scotty O'Neil
Duke Morgan
Scott Gentry, on-air weekday mornings and Saturdays
David Allen, on-air weekday afternoons and Sundays
Ron Kirsh, on-air weekday overnights and Saturdays
John Tesh (Syndicated), on-air weekday evenings and Saturdays

References

External links

JUL
Soft adult contemporary radio stations in the United States
Radio stations established in 2001
2001 establishments in Nevada